Fair Trial (1932–1958) was a British Thoroughbred racehorse and champion sire. He was bred and raced by John Arthur Dewar, who also bred and raced Tudor Minstrel.

The leading sire in Great Britain and Ireland in 1950, during his career Fair Trial sired 201 race winners, including Classic winners Lambert Simnel, Court Martial, Festoon, and Palestine. Through his daughters, Fair Trial was the 1951 leading broodmare sire in Great Britain and Ireland.

References
 Fair Trial's pedigree and partial racing stats
 Fair Trial at the National Horseracing Museum, Newmarket

1932 racehorse births
Racehorses bred in the United Kingdom
Racehorses trained in the United Kingdom
British Champion Thoroughbred Sires
British Champion Thoroughbred broodmare sires
Thoroughbred family 9-c
Chefs-de-Race